Kevin Alfred Strom (born August 17, 1956) is an American white nationalist, neo-Nazi, Holocaust denier, white separatist, and founder of National Vanguard.

In April 2008, Strom was sentenced to 23 months in prison for possession of child pornography.

Early life and activism
After encouraging his hatred of communism, a high school teacher informed him about the John Birch Society where Strom reputedly first met members of the National Alliance led by the neo-nazi William Luther Pierce and abandoned the JBS because, as he has stated, members of the society were forbidden to discuss race. Via Pierce, Strom learned of notions such as ZOG (the conspiracy theory alleging a Zionist Occupied Government in the United States), as well as White supremacy, and that the Civil rights movement was degenerate. He began to work for Pierce after graduating from high school.

In 1982, Strom became a member of the NA, a group described as antisemitic, racist, and neo-Nazi.

Activism until 2007

Strom is a former broadcast engineer and holds amateur radio license WB4AIO. Between 1983 and 1991, a pirate radio station named Voice of Tomorrow operated on shortwave and mediumwave frequencies, and broadcast openly racist and neo-Nazi material. According to Strom's ex-wife, Kirsten Kaiser, Voice of Tomorrow was operated by Strom.

As part of his involvement with NA, Strom broadcast a weekly "American Dissident Voices" hour on radio, espousing antisemitic views.

During the weekend of April 16–17, 2005, Strom and several others were expelled from the National Alliance because of a dispute with the new Alliance leader Erich Gliebe. Strom and some other expelled members founded National Vanguard, headquartered in Charlottesville, Virginia. Claiming that his new organization was the true successor to NA, Strom continued his weekly radio broadcasts and used National Vanguard's website to host and promote the views of other racists, including David Duke.

Strom was briefly the managing editor of The Truth at Last newspaper during 2005. Several sources have described this tabloid as being highly antisemitic and racist, because it often referred to Africans as an inferior race. Strom's boss at The Truth at Last, Edward Fields, is a former Grand Dragon of the New Order Knights of the Ku Klux Klan.

Strom was a close associate of University of Illinois Classics professor and nationalist writer Revilo P. Oliver, who has been described as "one of America's most notorious fascists" and, according to B'nai Brith Canada, was "a long time proponent of antisemitism".

Arrest, conviction, prison and release
On January 4, 2007, Strom was arrested in Greene County, Virginia, on charges of possession of child pornography and witness tampering. The Grand Jury later added the charges of receiving child pornography and of seeking to coerce a 10-year-old into a sexual relationship. At the October 2007 federal trial on charges of "attempting to coerce a 10-year-old girl into a sexual relationship by sending her anonymous gifts, driving past her house and writing lyrics to love songs declaring his desire to marry her", and of witness intimidation, Judge Norman K. Moon threw out both charges due to lack of evidence of witness tampering or solicitation of sex, but added that Strom, then in his early 50s, had engaged in questionable conduct.

At the plea hearing on January 14, 2008, Strom pleaded guilty to one count of possession of child pornography in exchange for the other charges to be dropped, and was held at Albemarle-Charlottesville Regional Jail while awaiting sentencing. He was sentenced to 23 months in prison in April 2008. Strom told the court before being sentenced that he was "not a pedophile" and was "in fact the precise opposite of what has been characterized in this case," saying he had been "unwillingly" possessing 10 images of child pornography and that those came from an online forum he had visited which had been "flooded with spam," which included "sleazy, tragic" pictures of children that he deleted. The judge of the case responded: "Mr. Strom, you pled guilty to charges that now you're saying you're innocent. I prefer people plead not guilty than put it on me." Strom was released from prison on September 3, 2008, at which point he resided in Earlysville, Virginia.

"True Rulers" quotation
The statement "To learn who rules over you, simply find out who you are not allowed to criticize" has been falsely attributed to Voltaire, the French Enlightenment philosopher. The phrase, however, is believed to have originated in an essay by Strom which was first published in 1993: "All America Must Know the Terror that is Upon Us". He wrote: "To determine the true rulers of any society, all you must do is ask yourself this question: Who is it that I am not permitted to criticize?".

Personal life
Strom had three children with his first wife, Kirsten Kaiser. Since their marriage ended, Kaiser has spoken about her life with Strom in several interviews. She has also written a book, The Bondage of Self, on her experiences with Strom and the National Alliance.

References

External links
Kevin Strom's Homepage

Hook Weekly interview with Strom's current but estranged wife, Elisha Strom
Southern Poverty Law Center profile of Kevin Strom
SPLC article about life with Strom

1956 births
Living people
21st-century American criminals
American anti-communists
American conspiracy theorists
American Holocaust deniers
American people convicted of child pornography offenses
American prisoners and detainees
Anti-Zionism in the United States
Antisemitism in the United States
Discrimination against LGBT people in the United States
People from Charlottesville, Virginia
White separatists